The Maltese Government 2013–2017 was the Government of Malta from 11 March 2013 till 1 May 2017. The Maltese government is elected through a General Election for a five-year term (projected dissolution was 10 March 2018). The Head of Government was Joseph Muscat. On 1 May 2017, whilst speaking during a Labour Party mass meeting, Prime Minister Joseph Muscat announced a snap general election for June 3 2017, a year before the end of his term.

Cabinet

|}

See also
List of Maltese governments
Maltese Government 2008–2013

References

Government of Malta
2010s in Malta
2013 establishments in Malta
Cabinets established in 2013
2017 disestablishments in Malta
Cabinets disestablished in 2017